"Some Broken Hearts Never Mend" is a song written by Wayland Holyfield, and recorded by American country music artist Don Williams.  It was released in January 1977 as the first single from the album Visions.  The song was Williams' sixth number one on the country chart.  The single stayed at number one for a single week and spent a total of 12 weeks within the top 40.

The song was also an international hit for Telly Savalas. It topped the Swiss charts for two weeks, and peaked at No. 2 in Austria and No. 4 in Netherlands.

A cover version of the song, performed by Danny McBride, Adam DeVine and Edi Patterson, is used as the soundtrack to the final scene of the second season of the comedy series The Righteous Gemstones.

Chart performance
Don Williams

Year-end charts

Brendan Shine

Telly Savalas

References

1977 songs
1977 singles
1999 singles
Don Williams songs
Number-one singles in Switzerland
Songs written by Wayland Holyfield
ABC Records singles
Dot Records singles
Songs about heartache